Paul C. Hufnagle (January 1936 – October 11, 2017) was an American businessman and politician and former member of the Minnesota House of Representatives from the 41A district.

Hufnagle was born in Cleveland, Ohio. In 1937, Hufnagle and his family moved to Minneapolis, Minnesota. He graduated from DeLaSalle High School in Minneapolis, and then went to the University of St. Thomas. In 1957, Hufnagle received his bachelor's degree in economics from University of Minnesota and went to graduate school at University of Minnesota. He lived in Bloomington, Minnesota and was a banker. Hufnagle served in the Minnesota House of Representatives and was a Republican. Hufnagle died in Bloomington, Minnesota.

Notes

1936 births
2017 deaths
Politicians from Cleveland
Politicians from Minneapolis
People from Bloomington, Minnesota
University of Minnesota College of Liberal Arts alumni
University of St. Thomas (Minnesota) alumni
Businesspeople from Minnesota
Republican Party members of the Minnesota House of Representatives
20th-century American businesspeople
DeLaSalle High School (Minneapolis) alumni